Rama Cay Creole is a Creole language spoken by some 800 to 900 people on the island of Rama Cay in eastern Nicaragua. It is based on Miskito Coast Creole with additional elements of the Chibchan language Rama and purportedly some elements of English spoken with a German accent. The creolization of the language is supposed to have happened when Moravian missionaries who were native Germans but preached in English encouraged the Rama-speaking population of the island to shift to English.

References

Report on Miskito Coast Creole with a short mention of Rama Cay Creole
Assadi, Barbara, 1983, Rama Cay Creole English, pp. 115–122 in Holm, John A, Ed. 1983 Central American English. Varieties of English around the World. T2. Heidelberg: Gross. John Benjamins: Amsterdam.

English language in North America
English-based pidgins and creoles
Languages of Nicaragua
Endangered pidgins and creoles
South Caribbean Coast Autonomous Region
Languages of the African diaspora